A coherent system of units is a system of units of measurement used to express physical quantities that are defined in such a way that the equations relating the numerical values expressed in the units of the system have exactly the same form, including numerical factors, as the corresponding equations directly relating the quantities. It is a system in which every quantity has a unique unit, or one that does not use conversion factors.

A coherent derived unit is a derived unit that, for a given system of quantities and for a chosen set of base units, is a product of powers of base units, with the proportionality factor being one.

If a system of quantities has equations that relate quantities and the associated system of units has corresponding base units, with one base unit for each base quantity, then it is coherent if and only if every derived unit of the system is coherent.

The concept of coherence was developed in the mid-nineteenth century by, amongst others, Kelvin and James Clerk Maxwell and promoted by the British Science Association.  The concept was initially applied to the centimetre–gram–second (CGS) in 1873 and the foot–pound–second systems (FPS) of units in 1875. The International System of Units (1960) was designed around the principle of coherence.

Example
In SI, which is a coherent system, the unit of power is the watt, which is defined as one joule per second. In the US customary system of measurement, which is non-coherent, the unit of power is the horsepower, which is defined as 550 foot-pounds per second (the pound in this context being the pound-force); similarly the gallon is 231 cubic inches.

Before the metric system
The earliest units of measure devised by humanity bore no relationship to each other.  As both humanity's understanding of philosophical concepts and the organisation of society developed, so units of measurement were standardised – first particular units of measure had the same value across a community, then different units of the same quantity (for example feet and inches) were given a fixed relationship. Apart from Ancient China where the units of capacity and of mass were linked to red millet seed, there is little evidence of the linking of different quantities until the Enlightenment.

Relating quantities of the same kind

The history of the measurement of length dates back to the early civilisations of the Middle East (10000 BC – 8000 BC). Archeologists have been able to reconstruct the units of measure in use in Mesopotamia, India, the Jewish culture and many others. Archeological and other evidence shows that in many civilisations, the ratios between different units for the same quantity of measure were adjusted so that they were integer numbers.  In many early cultures such as Ancient Egypt, multiples of 2, 3 and 5 were not always used—the Egyptian royal cubit being 28 fingers or 7 hands. In 2150 BC, the Akkadian emperor Naram-Sin rationalised the Babylonian system of measure, adjusting the ratios of many units of measure to multiples of 2, 3 or 5, for example there were 6 she (barleycorns) in a shu-si (finger) and 30 shu-si in a kush (cubit).

Relating quantities of different kinds
Non-commensurable quantities have different physical dimensions, which means that adding or subtracting them is not meaningful. For instance, adding the mass of an object to its volume has no physical meaning. However, new quantities (and, as such, units) can be derived via multiplication and exponentiation of other units. As an example, the SI unit for force is the newton, which is defined as kg⋅m⋅s−2. Since a coherent derived unit is one which is defined by means of multiplication and exponentiation of other units but not multiplied by any scaling factor other than 1, the pascal is a coherent unit of pressure (defined as kg⋅m−1⋅s−2), but the bar (defined as ) is not.

Note that coherence of a given unit depends on the definition of the base units. However, a coherent unit remains coherent (and a non-coherent unit remains non-coherent) if the base units are redefined in terms of other units with the numerical factor always being unity.

Metric system

Rational system and use of water
The concept of coherence was only introduced into the metric system in the third quarter of the nineteenth century; in its original form the metric system was non-coherent – in particular the litre was 0.001 m3 and the are (from which we get the hectare) was 100 m2. A precursor to the concept of coherence was however present in that the units of mass and length were related to each other through the physical properties of water, the gram having been designed as being the mass of one cubic centimetre of water at its freezing point.

The CGS system had two units of energy, the erg that was related to mechanics and the calorie that was related to thermal energy, so only one of them (the erg, equivalent to the g⋅cm2/s2) could bear a coherent relationship to the base units. By contrast, coherence was a design aim of the SI, resulting in only one unit of energy being defined – the joule.

Dimension-related coherence
Work of James Clerk Maxwell and others

Each variant of the metric system has a degree of coherence – the various derived units being directly related to the base units without the need of intermediate conversion factors. An additional criterion is that, for example, in a coherent system the units of force, energy and power be chosen so that the equations
 =  × 
 =  × 
 =  / 
hold without the introduction of constant factors. Once a set of coherent units have been defined, other relationships in physics that use those units will automatically be true – Einstein's mass–energy equation, does not require extraneous constants when expressed in coherent units.

Isaac Asimov wrote, "In the cgs system, a unit force is described as one that will produce an acceleration of 1 cm/sec2  on a mass of 1 gm. A unit force is therefore 1 cm/sec2  multiplied by 1 gm." These are independent statements. The first is a definition; the second is not. The first implies that the constant of proportionality in the force law has a magnitude of one; the second implies that it is dimensionless. Asimov uses them both together to prove that it is the pure number one.

Asimov's conclusion is not the only possible one. Since the proportionality constant here is dimensionless and the units in any equation must balance without any numerical factor other than one, it follows that 1 lbf = 1 lb⋅ft/s2. Although the pound-force is a coherent derived unit in this system according to the official definition, the system itself is not considered to be coherent because of the presence of the proportionality constant in the force law.

A variant of this system applies the unit s2/ft to the proportionality constant. This has the effect of identifying the pound-force with the pound. The pound is then both a base unit of mass and a coherent derived unit of force. One may apply any unit one pleases to the proportionality constant. If one applies the unit s2/lb to it, then the foot becomes a unit of force. In a four-unit system (English engineering units), the pound and the pound-force are distinct base units, and the proportionality constant has the unit lbf⋅s2/(lb⋅ft).

All these systems are coherent. One that is not is a three-unit system (also called English engineering units) in which F = ma that uses the pound and the pound-force, one of which is a base unit and the other, a noncoherent derived unit. In place of an explicit proportionality constant, this system uses conversion factors derived from the relation 1 lbf = 32.174 lb⋅ft/s2. In numerical calculations, it is indistinguishable from the four-unit system, since what is a proportionality constant in the latter is a conversion factor in the former. The relation among the numerical values of the quantities in the force law is {F} = 0.031081 {m} {a}, where the braces denote the numerical values of the enclosed quantities. Unlike in this system, in a coherent system, the relations among the numerical values of quantities are the same as the relations among the quantities themselves.

The following example concerns definitions of quantities and units. The (average) velocity (v) of an object is defined as the quantitative physical property of the object that is directly proportional to the distance (d) traveled by the object and inversely proportional to the time (t) of travel, i.e., v = kd/t, where k is a constant that depends on the units used. Suppose that the metre (m) and the second (s) are base units; then the kilometer (km) and the hour (h) are noncoherent derived units. The metre per second (mps) is defined as the velocity of an object that travels one metre in one second, and the kilometer per hour (kmph) is defined as the velocity of an object that travels one kilometre in one hour. Substituting from the definitions of the units into the defining equation of velocity we obtain, 1 mps = k m/s and 1 kmph = k km/h = 1/3.6 k m/s = 1/3.6 mps. Now choose k = 1; then the metre per second is a coherent derived unit, and the kilometre per hour is a noncoherent derived unit. Suppose that we choose to use the kilometre per hour as the unit of velocity in the system. Then the system becomes noncoherent, and the numerical value equation for velocity becomes {v} = 3.6 {d}/{t}. Coherence may be restored, without changing the units, by choosing k = 3.6; then the kilometre per hour is a coherent derived unit, with 1 kmph = 1 m/s, and the metre per second is a noncoherent derived unit, with 1 mps = 3.6 m/s.

A definition of a physical quantity is a statement that determines the ratio of any two instances of the quantity. The specification of the value of any constant factor is not a part of the definition since it does not affect the ratio. The definition of velocity above satisfies this requirement since it implies that v1/v2 = (d1/d2)/(t1/t2); thus if the ratios of distances and times are determined, then so is the ratio of velocities. A definition of a unit of a physical quantity is a statement that determines the ratio of any instance of the quantity to the unit. This ratio is the numerical value of the quantity or the number of units contained in the quantity. The definition of the metre per second above satisfies this requirement since it, together with the definition of velocity, implies that v/mps = (d/m)/(t/s); thus if the ratios of distance and time to their units are determined, then so is the ratio of velocity to its unit. The definition, by itself, is inadequate since it only determines the ratio in one specific case; it may be thought of as exhibiting a specimen of the unit.

A new coherent unit cannot be defined merely by expressing it algebraically in terms of already defined units. Thus the statement, "the metre per second equals one metre divided by one second", is not, by itself, a definition. It does not imply that a unit of velocity is being defined, and if that fact is added, it does not determine the magnitude of the unit, since that depends on the system of units. In order for it to become a proper definition both the quantity and the defining equation, including the value of any constant factor, must be specified. After a unit has been defined in this manner, however, it has a magnitude that is independent of any system of units.

Catalogue of coherent relations
This list catalogues coherent relationships in various systems of units.

SI
The following is a list of coherent SI units:
frequency (hertz) = reciprocal of time (inverse seconds)
force (newtons) = mass (kilograms) × acceleration (m/s2)
pressure (pascals) = force (newtons) ÷ area (m2)
energy (joules) = force (newtons) × distance (metres)
power (watts) = energy (joules) ÷ time (seconds)
potential difference (volts) = power (watts) ÷ electric current (amps)
electric charge (coulombs) = electric current (amps) × time (seconds)
equivalent radiation dose (sieverts) = energy (joules) ÷ mass (kilograms)
absorbed radiation dose (grays) = energy (joules) ÷ mass (kilograms)
radioactive activity (becquerels) = reciprocal of time (s−1)
capacitance (farads) = electric charge (coulombs) ÷ potential difference (volts)
electrical resistance (ohms) = potential difference (volts) ÷ electric current (amperes) 
electrical conductance (siemens) = electric current (amperes) ÷ potential difference (volts)
magnetic flux (weber) = potential difference (volts) × time (seconds)
magnetic flux density (tesla) = magnetic flux (webers) ÷ area (square metres)

CGS
The following is a list of coherent centimetre–gram–second (CGS) system of units:
acceleration (gals) = distance (centimetres) ÷ time2 (s2)
force (dynes) = mass (grams) × acceleration (cm/s2)
energy (ergs) = force (dynes) × distance (centimetres)
pressure (barye) = force (dynes) ÷ area (cm2)
dynamic viscosity (poise) = mass (grams) ÷  (distance (centimetres) × time (seconds))
kinematic viscosity (stokes) = area (cm2) ÷ time (seconds)

FPS
The following is a list of coherent foot–pound–second (FPS) system of units:
force (poundal) = mass (pounds) × acceleration (ft/s2)

See also
Systems of measurement
Geometrized unit system
Planck units
Atomic units
Metre–kilogram–second system (MKS)
Metre–tonne–second system (MTS)
Quadrant–eleventh-gram–second system (QES)

References

Systems of units
Dimensional analysis